Lithophila radicata is a species of plant in the family Amaranthaceae. It is endemic to the Galapagos Islands in Ecuador.

References

radicata
Endemic flora of Ecuador
Near threatened flora of South America
Taxonomy articles created by Polbot